Raado is a 2022 Gujarati political thriller film directed by Krishnadev Yagnik and starring Hitu Kanodia, Yash Soni, Tarjanee Bhadla, Nikita Sharma, Bharat Chawda, Devarshi Shah, Prachi Thaker, Niilam Paanchal, and Hiten Kumar. Produced by Munna Shukul, Jayesh Patel and co-produced by Nilay Chotai, Mit Chotai, and Mehul Panchal, the music and background score of the film was composed Rahul Munjariya. Distribution rights are held by Panorama Studios.

Plot 
Some powerful people, with strong political influence, leaders of the crowd and determined law enforcement collide with one another and the universe implodes. An action packed political thriller - Raado

Cast
 Hitu Kanodia
 Yash Soni
 Tarjanee Bhadla
 Nikita Sharma 
 Bharat Chawda
 Devarshi Shah
 Prachi Thaker
 Niilam Paanchal
 Gaurang Anand
 Chetan Daiya 
 Rajan Thaker 
 Pratik Rathod
 Denisha Ghumra 
 Jay Vasavada
 Hiten Kumar

Development 
Official teaser of the film launched on June 13, 2022, on social media.  and the trailer of the film launched June 20, 2022  music has acquired by Panorama Studios. The music  and background score of the film has given by Rahul Mujariya.

References

External links
 

2022 films
2020s Gujarati-language films
Indian political thriller films
Films set in Ahmedabad
Films shot in Ahmedabad
Films shot in Gujarat
Films directed by Krishnadev Yagnik